is a former Japanese football player.

Ikegami previously played for FC Tokyo in the J1 League.

Club statistics

References

External links

1983 births
Living people
Sendai University alumni
Association football people from Chiba Prefecture
Japanese footballers
J1 League players
J2 League players
Japan Football League players
FC Tokyo players
Thespakusatsu Gunma players
FC Kariya players
FC Gifu players
Association football midfielders